Once in a Blue Moon is the debut solo album by Frankie Miller, utilising Brinsley Schwarz as his backing band, showcases Miller's skills as a singer and songwriter. The song "I Can’t Change It" was featured in episode 4 of the first series of the drama series Life on Mars . It was covered by Ray Charles on his album Brother Ray Is At It Again.
"After All (I Live My Life)" had already been recorded by Kenny Rogers and The First Edition on their hit album Tell It All Brother in 1970. It later appeared as the closing song in the 2011 Johnny Depp film, The Rum Diary.

Track listing
All tracks composed by Frankie Miller; except where indicated

Personnel
Frankie Miller - vocals, acoustic guitar, harmonica
 Bob Andrews - grand piano, junk piano, accordion, backing vocals
 Brinsley Schwarz - lead & acoustic guitars
 Ian Gomm - lead & acoustic guitars
 Nick Lowe - electric bass, double bass, backing vocals
 Billy Rankin - drums
Bridgit, Joy and Janice - backing vocals

Production credits
Recorded at Rockfield Studios
Engineered by Kingsley Ward, Ralph Downs
Produced by Dave Robinson

1973 debut albums
Frankie Miller albums
Chrysalis Records albums
Albums recorded at Rockfield Studios